Events from the year 1723 in Russia

Incumbents
 Monarch – Peter I

Events

 
 : The Treaty of Saint Petersburg (1723) concluded the Russo-Persian War of 1722-1723 between Imperial Russia and Safavid Iran.

Births
 Maria Choglokova, courtier (born 1756)

Deaths

References

1723 in Russia
Years of the 18th century in the Russian Empire